Vitaly Valeryevich Fridzon (born October 14, 1985) is a Russian professional basketball player for Zenit Saint Petersburg of the VTB United League. He also represents the senior Russian national basketball team. Standing at 1.95 m (6 ft 4 in), he mainly plays at the shooting guard position, but he can also play at the point guard position.

Professional career

Early years
Fridzon started his professional career in the Russian team Standart Toliatti, in 2001, and stayed with them until the end of the 2003–04 season.

Khimki

Fridzon then moved to the prominent Moscow-based team Khimki. With Khimki, he won the Russian Cup in 2007, and the VTB United League championship in 2011, while also being the VTB United League Final Four MVP. A year later, he won the EuroCup 2011–12 season championship, the second-tier level European continental championship, thus giving his team a spot in the upcoming EuroLeague 2012–13 season, after a year of absence from that competition. In the 2012–13 season, he averaged a career-high 11.4 points and 2.2 rebounds per game, in 24 EuroLeague games. However, Khimki didn't win any trophies that season.

CSKA Moscow
On June 13, 2013, Fridzon signed a two-year contract, with the option for a third season, with the Russian team CSKA Moscow. In his first season with CSKA, in the EuroLeague 2012–13 season, he averaged 7.5 points, 1.5 rebounds, and 1.1 assists per game, over 31 games.

In the 2014–15 season, CSKA Moscow managed to advance to the EuroLeague Final Four, for the fourth straight season, after eliminating Panathinaikos for the second straight season. in the quarterfinals series, with a 3–1 series win. However, in the EuroLeague semifinal game, despite being dubbed by media as an absolute favorite to advance, CSKA once again lost to Olympiacos. The final score was 70–68, after a great Olympiacos comeback in 4th quarter, led by Vassilis Spanoulis. CSKA Moscow eventually won the EuroLeague third place game, after defeating Fenerbahçe, by a score of 86–80. Fridzon had nearly the same season, statistically speaking, like his first season with the club, averaging 7.8 points, 2.3 rebounds, and 1.4 assists per game, over 23 games played in the EuroLeague. CSKA Moscow finished the season by winning the VTB United League season, after eliminating Khimki, with a 3–0 sweep in the league's finals series.

On June 16, 2016, he re-signed with the team, on a new two-year contract, with the option of another season.

On July 25, 2018, Fridzon and CSKA officially part ways after five seasons.

Lokomotiv Kuban
On July 25, 2018, Fridzon signed a two-year contract with the Russian club Lokomotiv Kuban.

Zenit Saint Petersburg
On July 18, 2020, Fridzon moved to Zenit Saint Petersburg on a one-year contract, marking his return to the EuroLeague. On June 3, 2021, Zenit announced that Fridzon's contract would not be renewed, making him a free agent once more.

On March 5, 2022, he has signed and joined back the team.

Russian national team

Fridzon is also a member of the senior Russian national basketball team. He won a bronze medal at the EuroBasket 2011, and a bronze medal at the 2012 Summer Olympics.

Career statistics

EuroLeague

|-
| style="text-align:left;"| 2009–10
| style="text-align:left;" rowspan=3| Khimki
| 16 || 2 || 19.0 || .375 || .327 || .964 || 2.4 || 2.0 || .4 || .1 || 6.5 || 5.9
|-
| style="text-align:left;"| 2010–11
| 9 || 7 || 22.5 || .328 || .313 || .759 || 4.1 || 1.4 || .7 || .1 || 8.2 || 7.3
|-
| style="text-align:left;"| 2012–13
| 24 || 5 || 24.0 || .450 || .432 || .813 || 2.5 || 2.2 || 1.0 || .1 || 11.4 || 9.1
|-
| style="text-align:left;"| 2013–14
| style="text-align:left;" rowspan=5| CSKA Moscow
| 31 || 7 || 17.8 || .520 || .500 || .853 || 1.5 || 1.1 || .5 || .1 || 7.5 || 6.7
|-
| style="text-align:left;"| 2014–15
| 23 || 18 || 18.3 || .417 || .423 || .872 || 2.3 || 1.4 || .7 || .1 || 7.8 || 6.3
|-
| style="text-align:left;background:#AFE6BA;"| 2015–16†
| 27 || 14 || 13.9 || .475 || .429 || .833 || 1.7 || .9 || .6 || .0 || 6.4 || 5.3
|-
| style="text-align:left;"| 2016–17
| 35 || 6 || 12.9 || .511 || .417 || .860 || 1.2 || .8 || .6 || .3 || 5.9 || 5.0
|-
| style="text-align:left;"| 2017–18
| 30 || 0 || 7.6 || .372 || .382 || .882 || .7 || .4 || .3 || .1 || 2.9 || .9
|- class="sortbottom"
| style="text-align:left;"| Career
| style="text-align:left;"|
| 195 || 59 || 15.4 || .447 || .419 || .851 || 1.8 || 1.2 || .6 || .1 || 6.8 || 5.3

References

External links

Vitaly Fridzon at draftexpress.com
Vitaly Fridzon at eurobasket.com
Vitaly Fridzon at euroleague.net
Vitaly Fridzon at fiba.com
Vitaly Fridzon at vtb-league.com

1985 births
Living people
2010 FIBA World Championship players
2019 FIBA Basketball World Cup players
Basketball players at the 2008 Summer Olympics
Basketball players at the 2012 Summer Olympics
BC Khimki players
BC Krasnye Krylia players
BC Zenit Saint Petersburg players
Medalists at the 2012 Summer Olympics
Olympic basketball players of Russia
Olympic bronze medalists for Russia
Olympic medalists in basketball
PBC CSKA Moscow players
PBC Lokomotiv-Kuban players
People from Klintsy
Point guards
Russian Jews
Russian men's basketball players
Shooting guards
Sportspeople from Bryansk Oblast